In Jewish folklore, Broxa is a bird that is said to suck the milk of goats and sometimes human blood during the night.

In medieval Portugal, the Broxa was considered to be a shape shifting entity-as a witch in female form and in male form, a demon. It has been speculated that this creature was derived from the Jewish mythical creature.

See also 

 Chupacabra

References

Jewish legendary creatures
Legendary birds
European demons
Portuguese mythology
Portuguese legendary creatures
Vampires
Judaism and witchcraft
European witchcraft